This is a list of draft picks by the Sacramento Kings of the NBA. In total, the Kings have had 514 draft picks.

Key

NBA Draft picks

Notes

References

 
National Basketball Association draft
draft history